Adriano Fuscone (died 1578) was a Roman Catholic prelate who served as Bishop of Aquino (1552–1578).

Biography
On 22 Oct 1552, Adriano Fuscone was appointed during the papacy of Pope Julius III as Bishop of Aquino.
On 16 Dec 1554, he was consecrated bishop by Giovanni Michele Saraceni, Archbishop of Acerenza e Matera, with Ascanio Ferreri, Bishop Emeritus of Montepeloso, and Giovanni Andrea Croce, Bishop of Tivoli, serving as co-consecrators. 
He served as Bishop of Aquino until his death in 1578.

Episcopal succession

References

External links and additional sources
 (for Chronology of Bishops) 
 (for Chronology of Bishops) 

16th-century Italian Roman Catholic bishops
Bishops appointed by Pope Julius III
1578 deaths